Drift: The Sideways Craze is a 2007 documentary television film about professional drifting.  It features drifting champion Samuel Hubinette and upcoming star Ken Gushi preparing for the D1 Grand Prix, while teaching an amateur the basics of drifting. The film was aired for four years by Discovery HD and is included as bonus content in Fast and The Furious Blu-ray Box Set.

External links
 

2007 television films
2007 films
American auto racing films
American sports documentary films
2007 documentary films
Documentary films about auto racing
2000s American films